Willem Cornelis "Wim" Kan (15 January 1911 – 8 September 1983) was a Dutch cabaret artist. Together with Toon Hermans and Wim Sonneveld, he is considered to be one of the Great Three of Dutch cabaret.

In 1936, he established the ABC Cabaret, which soon became one of the most successful Dutch cabaret groups, in which several artists debuted who later became famous.

In 1940, the ABC Cabaret was touring the Dutch East Indies, and because of the German invasion could not return to the Netherlands. After the Japanese conquest of the Dutch East Indies, he was deported to camps at the Burma Railway. Because of his experiences at these camps he later agitated against Hirohito's visit to the Netherlands in 1971.

Wim Kan is possibly best known as the originator of the tradition of the so-called "Oudejaarsconferences". These are performances of political cabaret on (or around) New Year's Eve, discussing the events of the past year. Wim Kan made the first oudejaarsconference in 1954, which was broadcast on radio. His first televised oudejaarsconference was in 1973, scoring an audience measurement of 75% and record appreciations rating of 8.8 (out of 10). Although he actually made only 5 television conferences (1973, 1976, 1979, 1981, 1982), they made such an impact that many people remember it as a yearly tradition.

References

External links
De Wim Kan Pagina: New Year's Eve cabarets, historical audio, and quotes, in cooperation with the Dutch World Broadcaster (Radio Nederland Wereldomroept).

1911 births
1983 deaths
Dutch male comedians
Dutch comedy musicians
Dutch cabaret performers
Dutch satirists
20th-century Dutch male singers
Entertainers from The Hague
World War II civilian prisoners held by Japan
Burma Railway prisoners